Competitive Rugby League was established in Cornwall in 2010 by Joe Catcheside, who working on behalf of the Rugby Football League, organised and established an annual fixture between Devon and Cornwall. Until this time all rugby league played in Cornwall had been exhibition matches and featured teams from outside Cornwall. The first match between Devon and Cornwall was played in August 2010. The match is now played annually and is regularly billed as the "County Clash" or the "County of Origin" game and the teams play for the Martin Roddy MBE Trophy.

The Cornwall Rugby League Association currently has only one member; Cornish Rebels RLFC who were established in 2013 and play in the South West Premier Division. They will be joined by Cornwall R.L.F.C. in 2022, playing in the third tier of the professional game RFL League 1.

History
The first rugby league matches to take place in Cornwall were a series of exhibition matches between Hull F.C. and Hull Kingston Rovers which took place on three consecutive evenings in June 1962. The first match was at the Mennaye Field (a rugby union ground); the home of Penzance–Newlyn RFC and the former club of Hull Kingston Rovers player Graham Paul. Two more matches took place at Camborne and Falmouth. There was an earlier attempt to introduce rugby league via a Western League in 1912.

The next matches to be played in Cornwall were in 1985 when Mansfield Marksman beat Carlisle in a challenge match at Penlee Park, Penzance and two Doncaster teams played each other at Looe in a second challenge match. The formation of the South West League in 1984−85 saw two amateur teams from Cheltenham and Bristol play at Ludgvan.

Martin Roddy MBE Trophy
On 16 September 2010 the first team to represent Cornwall took to the field to play Devon at the Rectory Ground, Devonport.
 In 2012 the match was renamed from the Tamar Cup to the Martin Roddy MBE Trophy. 

 The 2011 match was sponsored by Leeds Rhinos as part of their commitment to develop the game in the south-west.
 The 2015 matches are contested as the County of Origin series

Cornish Rebels
In March 2013 the first ever rugby league club was established in Cornwall. Cornish Rebels RLFC currently play in the South West Rugby League against Devon Sharks, Exeter Centurions, North Devon Raiders, Plymouth Titans and Somerset Vikings A. Their home matches are played at The Recreation Ground, home of rugby union club Redruth RFC.

Semi-professional club
Cornwall R.L.F.C. will join the professional league system in 2022, playing in the third tier RFL League 1.

References

 
Rugby League